A tarn (or corrie loch)  is a mountain lake, pond or pool, formed in a cirque excavated by a glacier.  A moraine may form a natural dam below a tarn.

Etymology

The word is derived from the Old Norse word tjörn ("a small mountain lake without tributaries") meaning pond. In parts of Northern England – predominantly Cumbria but also areas of North Lancashire and North Yorkshire – 'tarn' is widely used as the name for small lakes or ponds, regardless of their location and origin (e.g. Talkin Tarn, Urswick Tarn, Malham Tarn). Similarly, in Scandinavian languages, a tjern or tjørn (both Norwegian) or tjärn or tärn (both Swedish) is a small natural lake, often in a forest or with vegetation closely surrounding it or growing into the tarn.

The specific technical use for a body of water in a glacial corrie comes from high number of tarns found in corries in the Lake District, an upland area in Cumbria. Nonetheless, there are many more bodies of water called 'tarn' in the Lake District than actually fit this technical use.

Formation
Tarns are the result of small glaciers called cirque glaciers. Glacial cirques (or 'corries') form as hollows on mountainsides near the firn line. Eventually, the hollow in which a cirque glacier develops may become a large bowl shape in the side of the mountain, caused by weathering, by ice segregation, and as well as being eroded by plucking. The basin will become deeper as it continues to be eroded by ice segregation and abrasion. A cirque typically will be partially surrounded on three sides by steep cliffs, with a fourth side a form of moraine constructed from glacial till, which forms the lip, threshold or sill, from which either a stream or glacier will flow away from the cirque.

Tarns form from the melting of the cirque glacier. They may either be seasonal features as supraglacial lakes, or permanent features which form in the hollows left by cirques in formerly glaciated areas.

Gallery

See also

 Pond
 Proglacial lake
Kettle (landform)

References

External links 
 
 

de:Karsee